Sussex is a census-designated place (CDP) in and the county seat of Sussex County, Virginia, United States. The population as of the 2020 Census was 181.

The Sussex County Courthouse Historic District was listed on the National Register of Historic Places in 1973.

Demographics

2020 census

Note: the US Census treats Hispanic/Latino as an ethnic category. This table excludes Latinos from the racial categories and assigns them to a separate category. Hispanics/Latinos can be of any race.

References

Unincorporated communities in Virginia
Census-designated places in Sussex County, Virginia
County seats in Virginia
Census-designated places in Virginia